Jost Meier (15 March 1939 – 5 December 2022) was a Swiss composer and orchestra conductor.

Biography
After he completed his studies in Solothurn, Meier studied cello at the Conservatory of Biel under  and earned a diploma in teaching. He then played for multiple ensembles, including the Tonhalle-Orchester Zürich and the Camerata Bern.

Meier served as conductor of the Biel Solothurn Symphony Orchestra from 1969 to 1979 (or from 1968 to 1980 according to other sources). In 1980, he became conductor of the Theater Basel.

Meier composed several operas, including , Der Drache, and Der Zoobär. In 2018, his works became available at the library of the City of Basel Music Academy.

Jost Meier died in Basel on 5 December 2022, at the age of 83.

References

1939 births
2022 deaths
Swiss composers
Swiss conductors (music)
People from Solothurn